Sima Fang (149–219), courtesy name Jiangong or Wenyu, was an official who lived during the Eastern Han dynasty of China. Through his second son Sima Yi, he was an ancestor of the ruling Sima clan of the Jin dynasty (266–420) of China.

Life
Sima Fang's ancestral home was in Wen County, which is present-day Wen County, Henan. He was a son of Sima Jun, who served as the Administrator of Yingchuan Commandery during the Eastern Han dynasty.

Sima Fang started his career as a minor official in his home commandery, Henei Commandery. Later, he rose through the ranks to become the Prefect of Luoyang and Intendant of Jingzhao under the Han central government. In his old age, he was reassigned to be a Cavalry Commandant. He enjoyed reading the biographies of notable officials in the Book of Han and could even recite over 100,000 lines from the book. He died at the age of 71 (by East Asian age reckoning) in the year 219.

In the spring of 242 during the Three Kingdoms period, Cao Fang, the third emperor of the Wei state, honoured Sima Fang with the posthumous title "Marquis Cheng of Wuyang" in recognition of the contributions to Wei by Sima Fang's second son, Sima Yi.

Sima Fang was known for being a serious and solemn man throughout his life; he was humourless even in informal settings such as banquets. He maintained a very low profile and avoided interacting with his colleagues outside the workplace. He was also strict and stern towards his sons even after they grew up and became adults. In his presence, they did not dare to move, sit or speak without his permission.

Relationship with Cao Cao
The Cao Man Zhuan, an unofficial biography of Cao Cao, claimed that when Sima Fang was serving as an assistant official in the imperial secretariat, he recommended Cao Cao to serve as the Commandant of the North District in Luoyang. However, the Sitishu Shixu mentioned that Cao Cao was recommended by Liang Hu. Pei Songzhi, who annotated Cao Cao's biography in the Records of the Three Kingdoms, commented that the Cao Man Zhuan account was correct. This was because, according to the Book of Jin by Wang Yin, during the Jin dynasty, an academician once mentioned Sima Fang recommending Cao Cao to be the Commandant of the North District.

In 216, after Cao Cao was conferred the title of a vassal king – King of Wei – by Emperor Xian, he summoned Sima Fang to meet him in Ye (in present-day Handan, Hebei). He joked with Sima Fang: "Do you think the Cao Cao of today can still be a Commandant of the North District?" Sima Fang replied: "When I recommended Your Highness to assume that appointment, I knew you were capable of performing your duties well." Cao Cao laughed.

Names
Historical records traditionally recorded his name as 司馬防 (Sīmǎ Fáng) and courtesy name as 建公 (Jiàngōng). However, in 1952, fragments of a stone tablet detailing Sima Fang's life were discovered along Guangji Street in central Xi'an, Shaanxi, and they indicated his name as 司馬芳 (Sīmǎ Fāng) with the courtesy name 文豫 (Wényù) instead.

Family

Sima Fang was an 11th-generation descendant of Sima Ang. His great-grandfather, Sima Jūn, whose courtesy name was Shuping, served as General Who Attacks the West. His grandfather, Sima Liang, whose courtesy name was Gongdu, served as the Administrator of Yuzhang Commandery (豫章郡; around present-day Nanchang, Jiangxi).

Sima Fang's father, Sima Jùn, whose courtesy name was Yuanyi, served as the Administrator of Yingchuan Commandery (潁川郡; around present-day Xuchang, Henan). Sima Jùn was described as eight chi and three cun tall, with a thick waist. As he had an extraordinary and impressive appearance, the folks in his hometown regarded him highly. He was also well-read and interested in history.

Sima Fang had eight sons: Sima Lang, Sima Yi, Sima Fu, Sima Kui, Sima Xun, Sima Jin, Sima Tong and Sima Min. Among them, the most notable one was Sima Yi, who served as a military general and regent of the state of Cao Wei in the Three Kingdoms period. Sima Fang's great-grandson, Sima Yan, later became the founding emperor of the Jin dynasty (266–420).

See also
 Lists of people of the Three Kingdoms

References

 Chen, Shou (3rd century). Records of the Three Kingdoms (Sanguozhi).
 Fang, Xuanling (648). Book of Jin (Jin Shu).
 Pei, Songzhi (5th century). Annotations to Records of the Three Kingdoms (Sanguozhi zhu).
 
 

149 births
219 deaths
Han dynasty politicians from Henan
Politicians from Jiaozuo
Mayors of Xi'an